Winnipeg North Centre was a federal electoral district in Manitoba, Canada, that was represented by a Member of Parliament (MP) in the House of Commons of Canada from 1925 to 2004. It is a largely working class riding in Winnipeg and has traditionally had a large Jewish and immigrant population.

The riding was created in 1924 and was first used for the 1925 federal election when it elected J.S. Woodsworth of the Independent Labour Party as its first MP. Woodsworth had previously represented Winnipeg Centre since the 1921 election. Woodsworth was re-elected there in 1926 and 1930. He held the seat for the party through the 1935 election and 1940 elections until his death in 1942. In 1932, Woodsworth helped found the Co-operative Commonwealth Federation (CCF) in 1932 and was named its first leader. 

After Woodsworth's death in 1942, a by-election held that year was won by Stanley Knowles of the CCF. Knowles held the seat until the 1958 election that returned a landslide for John Diefenbaker's Progressive Conservative Party of Canada and elected Tory John MacLean in Winnipeg North Centre.

Out of parliament, Knowles went to work for the Canadian Labour Congress, and played a leading role in creating the alliance between the CLC and the CCF that led to the creation of the New Democratic Party (NDP) in 1961. Knowles won Winnipeg North Centre for the NDP in the 1962 election, and held the riding until his retirement in 1984.

In the 1984 election, the riding stayed in NDP hands with the election of Cyril Keeper.  The NDP lost the riding in the 1988 election, however, when David Walker of the Liberal Party of Canada took the seat. Walker was re-elected in the 1993 election.

In the 1997 election, the NDP retook the riding (which since had its name changed to Winnipeg Centre) with Pat Martin becoming the MP. Martin retained the seat in the 2000 election.

The electoral district was abolished in 2003 when it was redistributed between Winnipeg North, Winnipeg Centre and Kildonan—St. Paul ridings.

Martin was re-elected to Parliament in Winnipeg Centre riding in the 2004 election.

This riding elected the following Members of Parliament:

Election results

By-election: On Mr. Woodsworth's death, 21 March 1942

See also 

 List of Canadian federal electoral districts
 Past Canadian electoral districts

External links 

Former federal electoral districts of Manitoba